Birmingham Road is the debut album by American singer-songwriter Jeff Black, released in 1998.

Members of the band Wilco back Black on this album. Iris DeMent is also a guest singer.

Reception

Writing for Allmusic, critic James Chrispell noted that Black "is a sincere singer/songwriter who puts a lot of feeling and emotion into his work, and the results are some of the best music released in the late 90s... For music lovers of all shapes and sizes, take a walk down Birmingham Road with Jeff Black. It'll feel like you've come home again."

Track listing 
All songs by Jeff Black
 "A Long Way to Go" – 4:01
 "What Do I Want" – 4:25
 "Birmingham Road" – 5:21
 "That's Just About Right" – 5:50
 "Noah's Ark" – 6:21
 "King of the World	" – 3:57
 "Uniontown" – 5:17
 "Ghosts in the Graveyard" – 5:23
 "Nebo Hill" – 4:53
 "Sheet" – 4:00
 "Carnival Song" – 4:56
 "The Valley" – 5:44

Personnel 
 Jeff Black – vocals, guitar, harmonica, background vocals
 Tionno Banks – organ, piano
 Randy Jacobs – guitar, mandoguitar
 Ken Coomer – drums, bongos
 Jay Bennett – organ, guitar, piano, accordion, background vocals, Farfisa organ
 Curt Bisquera – drums
 Tommy Jordan – percussion, organ, steel drums, background vocals, dulcimer
 Suzie Katayama – cello
 Greg Kurstin – Mini Moog
 Lance Morrison – bass
 John Stirratt – bass, drums
 Greg Wells – guitar, organ, bass, percussion, piano, accordion
 Marlon Young – guitar
 Iris DeMent – background vocals
Production notes
 Ben Grosse – producer, engineer, mixing
 Susan Rogers – producer, engineer
 Aaron Lepley – assistant engineer
 Boo Macleod – assistant engineer
 Michael "Elvis" Baskette – assistant engineer, mixing assistant
 Jim Champagne – assistant engineer
 Bob Ludwig – mastering
 Jack Joseph Puig – mixing
 Michael Tuller – programming, engineer
 Maude Gilman – art direction
 Michael Wilson – photography

References 

1998 debut albums